Plettenberg is a city in North Rhine-Westphalia, Germany.

Plettenberg may also refer to:

Plettenberg (mountain), a mountain in Baden-Württemberg, Germany
House of Plettenberg, a German noble family from Westphalia (members see below)

People with the surname
 Ferdinand von Plettenberg (1690–1737), Prime Minister of the Electorate of Cologne
 Frederick Christian von Plettenberg (1644–1706), prince bishop of Münster
 Georg von Plettenberg (1918-1980), Colonel of the Bundeswehr
 Gertrud von Plettenberg (15??–1608), royal mistress of Prince-Elector-Archbishop of Cologne Ernest of Bavaria
 Joachim van Plettenberg (1739–1793), Governor of the Cape of Good Hope and founder of Plettenberg Bay
 Karl von Plettenberg (1852–1938), General of the Infantry, Commandant-General of the Guards Corps and Adjutant General of the German Kaiser
 Kurt von Plettenberg (1891–1945), plenipotentiary of the House of Hohenzollern (the royal house of Prussia), one of the inner circle of the July 20th plot against Hitler
 Matthieu van Plattenberg (1607/8–1660), Baroque painter, draughtsman, etcher and engraver
 Wolter von Plettenberg (c. 1450–1535), Master of the Livonian Order

See also
Plettenberg Bay, a town in the Western Cape Province, South Africa